Kenneth Alford may refer to:

 Kenneth J. Alford (1881–1945), British composer
 Kenneth D. Alford, American non-fiction writer